Franziska Liebing (6 February 1899 – 3 January 1993) was a german film actress.

Biography
Franziska Liebing took lessons from the austrian silent film actress Emma Berndl (1877 - 1934) in Munich. She started in Wuerzburg in 1921, then worked in Nuremberg, at the "Münchener Schauspielhaus" and at Konrad Dreher's touring theater.

Between 1928 and 1932 she had an engagement at the "Landestheater Meiningen", after that she worked at the "Reichssender" in Munich; later she was a freelancer at various theaters and Berlin guest performance companies. Liebing belonged to the ensemble of the "Schauspielhaus" in Munich from 1925 to 1930 and appeared on stage at the "Meiningen Theater" in 1931/32. After a few years without an engagement, she was under contract in Berlin with Gustav Bartelmus, Richard Handwerk and Bernd Königsfeld.

Since the 1950s, she has also devoted herself extensively to work in film and television, where she often played smart, hands-on, but also curious neighbors and landladies, for example in the series "Funkstreife Isar 12", in "Die seltsamen Methoden des Franz Josef Wanninger" and in 1979, directed by Kurt Wilhelm, in the film version of Ludwig Thomas' peasant novel "Der Ruepp".

Franziska Liebing died on 3 January 1993, from natural causes, at the age of 93, at a nursing facility in Munich. Her grave is located in the old part of the "Westfriedhof" in Munich (grave 157-W-24).

Selected filmography
 1956: Ich suche Dich
 1958: … und nichts als die Wahrheit
 1959: Menschen im Netz
 1961–1963: Funkstreife Isar 12 (TV)
 1961: Jack Mortimer (TV)
 1962: Axel Munthe – Der Arzt von San Michele
 1963: Das Kriminalmuseum: Fünf Fotos (TV)
 1964: Das Kriminalmuseum: Tödliches Schach (TV)
 1965: Der Nachtkurier meldet: Schwindel auf Raten
 1965: Die Reise nach Steiermark (TV)
 1966: Das Kriminalmuseum: Das Etikett (TV)
 1965–1967: Die seltsamen Methoden des Franz Josef Wanninger (TV)
 1968: Madame Legros
 1971: Augenzeugen müssen blind sein (TV)
 1971: Willy Wonka & the Chocolate Factory
 1973: Hubertus Castle
 1973: Tatort: Weißblaue Turnschuhe (TV)
 1976: Tatort: Wohnheim Westendstraße (TV)
 1979: Der Ruepp (TV)

External links
 

1899 births
1993 deaths
20th-century German actresses